Sherman is the name of some places in the U.S. state of Wisconsin:
Sherman, Clark County, Wisconsin, a town
Sherman, Dunn County, Wisconsin, a town
Sherman, Iron County, Wisconsin, a town
Sherman, Sheboygan County, Wisconsin, a town